Life, Animated is a 2016 American documentary by director Roger Ross Williams. It is co-produced by Williams with Julie Goldman, Carolyn Hepburn and Christopher Clements. Life, Animated is based on journalist Ron Suskind's 2014 book Life, Animated: A Story of Sidekicks, Heroes, and Autism, which tells the story of his son, Owen Suskind, who struggled with autism and learned how to communicate with the outside world through his love of Disney films.

Upon its release, the film received rave reviews from critics and won numerous awards including the Sundance Film Festival award for Best Direction and the Special Achievement Annie Award. It was also nominated for the Academy Award for Best Documentary Feature Film category at the 89th Academy Awards, but lost to O.J.: Made in America.

Synopsis
Owen Suskind was diagnosed with autism at the age of 3. As Owen withdrew into his silent state, his parents almost lost hope that he would find some way to meaningfully interact with his world. That way was found through animated films, especially ones by Walt Disney Animation Studios, which provided Owen a way to understand the world through its stories to the point of creating his own. This film covers the life of Owen and how he communicates with the help of Disney and his family. However, Owen soon learns as well that there is more to real life, such as relationships and breakups, than what Disney can illustrate in animation even as his family prepares itself for an uncertain future with him.<ref>[https://www.awn.com/news/life-animated-tower-documentaries-shortlisted-oscar-race 'Life, Animated', 'Tower Documentaries Shortlisted in Oscar Race|Animation World Network]</ref>

Cast
 Jonathan Freeman as the voice of Jafar
 Gilbert Gottfried as the voice of Iago
 Alan Rosenblatt
 Owen Suskind as himself
 Ron Suskind as himself

Production
The animation is done by Mac Guff, which also worked on Illumination Entertainment films such as Despicable Me and The Lorax. To secure the rights for the clips and characters used in the film, Williams showed the unfinished product to the heads of department put together by Disney Productions president Sean Bailey. Roger refers to it as "the day I made the lawyers cry" after the end of the presentation. The films selected for the film were "100% Suskind".

Reception
The review aggregation website Rotten Tomatoes reported a 94% approval rating based on 116 reviews, with an average rating of 7.71/10. The website's critical consensus reads, "Life, Animated offers a heartwarming look at one family's journey, and a fascinating message that's more than enough to outweigh its unanswered questions." On Metacritic, the film holds a score of 75 out of 100, based on 25 critics, indicating "generally favorable reviews".The Guardians critic Lanre Bakare praised the film and said, "It's a beguiling mix of animated storytelling and narration that doesn't flinch from exploring the emotional highs and lows that accompany a life with autism." Kenneth Turan of LA Times lauded the film and said, "[Williams] spent two years on this project, and the trust everyone involved placed in him allowed for an emotional honesty that is Life, Animateds greatest strength." Writing for Variety, Justin Chang wrote, "This latest film from Roger Ross Williams (God Loves Uganda) teems with insights into how children's fantasy can and can't bridge a developmental gap, but works on an even more basic, emotional level as a warm testament to a family's love and resilience." The Hollywood Reporters Duane Byrge called it "a documentary gem." Ann Hornaday of The Washington Post positively reviewed the series and said, "Life, Animated makes fascinating points, about the power of cinema, about meeting our loved ones where they are and, as Ron says, about who gets to decide what constitutes a meaningful life" Rolling Stones chief film critic Peter Travers said, "In no way does Owen's story claim to be a cure-all. Instead of false hope, it offers up possibility, the chance of a stimulus that might get past the blocks of developmental disorder. That's more than encouraging. Life, Animated is truly inspirational."

Writing for The A.V. Club, Noel Murray said, "On the list of Disney-related 2016 releases about child-rearing and handicaps, this one goes just above Finding Dory. What it lacks in wacky hijinks, it makes up in hard truths." Reviewing for RogerEbert.com, film critic Sheila O'Malley wrote, "Powerful and emotional, without being manipulative. It is deeply inspiring, without trying to be. It is honest about Owen's struggles, and the struggles of his family." Entertainment Weeklys Joe McGovern also lauded the series, saying, "The Suskinds' humongous hearts are obviously in the right place and their openness is to be admired and encouraged - even if a book, more than a movie, remains the better venue to fairly and honestly tell Owen's extraordinary story." Kyle Smith of New York Post explained, "Life, Animated oversimplifies the situation, contriving to use endless clips from Disney movies to make a case that movie magic really can better people's lives. Unfortunately, by the end of the movie it's clear that Disney can't help Owen negotiate sex, breakups or many other challenges he faces as an adult."

Some publications however were more critical towards the film. In a lukewarm review of Empire David Parkinson wrote, "A touch twee at times, but the use of classic and original animation is admirable, while Owen emerges as the king of sidekicks." Film critic Anthony Lane of The New Yorker said, "Owen has made immense progress, to which Life, Animated is a stirring tribute, yet it leaves a trail of questions unanswered or unasked." The New York Timess Jeannette Catsoulis quipped, "Belaboring the cartoon connection, the director leaves the family struggles that enrich Mr. Suskind's 2014 book of the same title stubbornly veiled." In a less enthusiastic review for Slant Magazine Clayton Dillard stated, "It never addresses Disney's wholly manufactured stranglehold on turning adolescent desire into a consumerist impulse."

Land of the Lost Sidekicks
An exclusive short, based on Owen's fan fiction featuring a younger version of himself and his favorite Disney sidekicks battling against the evil Fuzzbutch, was released on The Wrap in 2016.

Sidekicks used in the film:
 Baloo from The Jungle Book (1967) 
 Timon and Rafiki from The Lion King (1994) 
 Iago and Abu from Aladdin (1992) 
 Lucky Jack from Home on the Range (2004) 
 Sebastian from The Little Mermaid'' (1989)

Accolades

References

External links
 Life, Animated on A&E
 
 
 

2010s American films
2010s English-language films
2016 documentary films
2016 films
American animated documentary films
American documentary films
American films with live action and animation
Animation fandom
Autism in the arts
Disney documentary films
Disney fandom
Documentary films about animation
Documentary films about autism
Documentary films about fandom
Documentary films about Jews and Judaism
Films based on non-fiction books
The Orchard (company) films